The Last Tycoon is an unfinished novel by F. Scott Fitzgerald. In 1941, it was published posthumously under this title, as prepared by his friend Edmund Wilson, a critic and writer. According to Publishers Weekly, the novel is "generally considered a roman a clef," with its lead character, Monroe Stahr, modeled after film producer Irving Thalberg. The story follows Stahr's rise to power in Hollywood, and his conflicts with rival Pat Brady, a character based on MGM studio head Louis B. Mayer.

It was adapted as a TV play in 1957 and a film in 1976 of the same name, with a screenplay for the motion picture by British dramatist Harold Pinter. Elia Kazan directed the film adaptation; Robert De Niro and Theresa Russell starred.

In 1993, a new version of the novel was published under the title The Love of the Last Tycoon, edited by Matthew Bruccoli, a Fitzgerald scholar. This version was adapted for a stage production that premiered in Los Angeles, California in 1998. In 2013, HBO announced plans to produce an adaptation. HBO cancelled the project and gave the rights to Sony Pictures, which produced and released the television series on Amazon Studios in 2016.

Plot summary

Set in the 1930s, The Last Tycoon traces the life of Hollywood studio manager Monroe Stahr, clearly based on Irving Thalberg (in charge of production at MGM), whom Fitzgerald had encountered several times.

The novel begins with young NYC college student Cecilia Brady (first-person narrator), the daughter of influential Hollywood producer Pat Brady, preparing to fly home to Los Angeles. At the airport, she is surprised to meet an old friend of her father, author Wylie White. White is accompanied by a failed producer introduced as Mr. Schwartz. Due to complications during the flight, they make a forced landing in Nashville, Tennessee. The threesome decide on a spontaneous trip to the historic estate of former President Andrew Jackson, but on arrival the attraction is closed. Wylie then proceeds to flirt shamelessly with Cecilia while Mr. Schwartz is fast asleep. When Schwartz awakens, he informs them that he has changed his mind and will not travel to Los Angeles with them. He asks Wylie to deliver a message to a friend, which he gladly accepts. The next day, Wylie and Cecilia learn that Schwartz committed suicide right after they left Nashville.

Cecilia realizes that the message Schwarz gave to Wylie was in fact for Monroe Stahr, her father's business partner. She has had a crush on Monroe for many years. Cecilia arrives at her father's film studio to pick him up for a birthday party. Due to an unexpected minor earthquake, Cecilia, her father, and his companions all end up in Stahr's office. A water pipe bursts and floods the set. Stahr beholds two women desperately clinging to the head of a statue – finding one of them to be the spitting image of his late wife. The day after, Stahr asks his secretary to identify the girls for him. She presents him with a phone number which he immediately uses to arrange a meeting with one of the girls. Unfortunately, it is not the girl he wished to see; she does not resemble his wife at all. Stahr gives her a ride home, where she insists that he come in and meet her friend (the young Irish-born Kathleen Moore). As soon as Moore opens the front door, Stahr recognizes her to be the woman he had seen the other night.

Kathleen withstands his advances to her and even refuses to tell him her name. It is only when Stahr happens to meet her again at a party that he can convince her to go out and have a cup of coffee with him. He drives her to the building site of his new house in Santa Monica. Kathleen seems reluctant to be with Stahr, but she still ends up having sex with him. A short time afterwards, Stahr receives a letter in which Kathleen confesses to have been engaged to another man for quite some time. She has now decided to marry him despite having fallen in love with Stahr.

Stahr asks Cecilia to arrange for a meeting with a suspected communist who wants to organize a labor union within the film studio. Stahr and Cecilia meet the man over supper where Stahr gets drunk and gets involved in a violent confrontation. Cecilia takes care of him and they grow closer. Cecilia's father, however, becomes more and more unhappy with Stahr as a business partner and has wanted to get rid of him for a long while. He could not approve less of his daughter's fancying him. Brady knows of Stahr's continued affair with the now-married Kathleen and tries to blackmail him into leaving the company. As he fails to achieve his goal via blackmail, he does not even shy away from hiring a professional killer. Stahr survives, and, in retaliation, also appoints a hit man to have Brady killed. Unlike Brady's, Stahr's conscience starts to trouble him. But, just as he contemplates calling the execution off, his plane crashes on its way back to New York City. The contract killer finishes his job unhindered and leaves Cecilia both without a father and without a lover – the two men who meant the world to her.

List of characters
 Monroe StahrHollywood film producer
 Pat BradyStahr's associate, also a film producer
 Cecilia Brady (Celia)Brady's daughter
 Kathleen MooreStahr's love interest (during the time of writing, Fitzgerald was living with journalist Sheila Graham who co-wrote the film script Beloved Infidel which portrayed their relationship whilst Fitzgerald was pursuing his unfinished novel. Fitzgerald states in this film that Kathleen is based on Sheila.)
 Minna Davis – Monroe Stahr's late wife
 Edna – Kathleen Moore's friend
 Wylie White, Manny Schwartz, Jane Maloney, George Boxley, Martha Dodd, the Tarletons - Writers
 Marcus – Film producer
 Broaca, Red Ridingwood – Film directors
 Joe Reinmund – Film supervisior and Stahr's all-around man
 Pete Zavras – Cameraman
 Jaques La Borwitz – Assistant producer
 Robinson – Stahr's troubleshooter
 Mike Van Dyke – Gagman
 Rodriguez, Johnny Swanson, Carole Lombard, Gary Cooper – actors
 Lee Kapper – Art director
 Mort Fleishacker – Company's lawyer
 Joe Popolos – Theatre owner
 Agge – Prince of Denmark
 Brimmer – Communist party member
 Catherine Doolan and Katy – Stahr's secretaries
 Birdy Peters, Maud, Rosemary Schmiel – Pat Brady's secretaries
 Bernie – Photographer
 Doctor Baer – Physician
  Malone – Policeman
 Ned Sollinger – Stahr's office boy
  Filipino – Stahr's servant
 Mr Smith – Stahr's assumed name in chapter one
  Unnamed – Chapter one: airplane pilots, stewardresses and a taxi driver. Chapter four: Ridingwood's actress

Publication history
The novel was unfinished and in rough form at the time of Fitzgerald's death at age 44. The literary critic and writer Edmund Wilson, a close friend of Fitzgerald, collected the notes for the novel and edited it for publication. The unfinished novel was published in 1941 as The Last Tycoon, by which name it is best known.

In 1993, another version of the novel was published under the title The Love of the Last Tycoon, as part of the Cambridge edition of the Works of F. Scott Fitzgerald, edited by Matthew J. Bruccoli, a Fitzgerald scholar. Bruccoli reworked the extant seventeen chapters of the thirty-one planned according to his interpretation of the author's notes. At least one reviewer considered Bruccoli's work to be a "remarkable feat of scholarship" and notes that it  "restored Fitzgerald's original version and has also restored the narrative's ostensible working title, one that implies that Hollywood is the last American frontier where immigrants and their progeny remake themselves."

Point of view
Fitzgerald wrote the novel in a blend of first person and third person narrations. While the story is ostensibly told by Cecilia, many scenes are narrated in which she is not present. Occasionally a scene will be presented twice, once through Cecilia and once through a third party.

Awards
The revised edition of The Love of The Last Tycoon won the Choice Outstanding Academic Books award of 1995.

Adaptations
1957: John Frankenheimer directed a TV version for Playhouse 90, with Jack Palance as Monroe Stahr.
1976: A film version was adapted for the screen by British playwright Harold Pinter, directed by Elia Kazan (his last film). It was produced by Sam Spiegel and released as The Last Tycoon. It starred Robert De Niro as Monroe Stahr and Theresa Russell as Cecilia Brady, and featured appearances by Robert Mitchum and Jack Nicholson. Pinter later won the Nobel Prize for his dramatic plays.
1998: A stage adaptation of the 1993 edition, by Simon Levy and authorized by the Fitzgerald Estate, opened at The Fountain Theatre in Los Angeles. It received high praise and numerous awards.
2013: a 90-minute audio adaptation by Feelgood Fiction for BBC Radio 4, adapted and directed by Bill Bryden, starring Aidan Gillen and Jack Shepherd. 
2014: Japan's all-female theatre company Takarazuka Revue staged a musical adaptation of The Love of The Last Tycoon for then Flower Troupe top star Tomu Ranju's farewell performance.
2016: On November 19, 2013, HBO announced that it planned a TV series based on the novel with Billy Ray writing the script. On November 7, 2014, Amazon Studios picked up Billy Ray's adaptation after HBO passed it off and announced it would be produced by Sony Pictures Television. On November 23, 2015, actor Matt Bomer was cast as Monroe Stahr, Lily Collins as Cecilia Brady, and it was announced that Ray would write and direct the pilot episode. The pilot was released June 17, 2016. The first season was released on July 28, 2017.  Plans for the second season were cancelled in September 2017.
2016: Simon Levy's stage adaptation, authorized by the Fitzgerald Estate, had its European premiere, opening at the Arts Theatre in London on August 17, 2016. Produced by Ruby In The Dust Theatre with the permission of the author. Directed by Linnie Reedman.

Publication history
1941, as The Last Tycoon, F. Scott Fitzgerald and Edmund Wilson. current 
1993, The Love of the Last Tycoon, Cambridge University Press, hardcover
2003, The Love of the Last Tycoon, Charles Scribner's Sons, paperback

References

External links
 The Last Tycoon at Internet Archive

1941 American novels
Unfinished novels
Novels by F. Scott Fitzgerald
Novels published posthumously
Hollywood novels
Novels about mass media owners
American novels adapted into films
American novels adapted into television shows
American novels adapted into plays
Roman à clef novels